Henry Arthur Shenk (November 29, 1906 – July 29, 1989) was an American football player and coach. He served as head football coach at the University of Kansas from 1943 to 1945, compiling a record of 11–16–3.

Head coaching record

References

External links
 

1906 births
1989 deaths
American football ends
Kansas Jayhawks football coaches
Kansas Jayhawks football players
People from Galena, Kansas